Domenico Bollani (1514–1579) was a diplomat and politician of the Republic of Venice, and as Bishop of Brescia from 1559 to 1579 he was a leading figure of the Catholic reform.

Political career 
Domenico Bollani was born to a noble family in Venice on 10 February 1514, or in 1513 according to other sources. He earned a doctorate of Laws at the University of Padova and he took the political career in the Republic of Venice He was elected in the Consiglio dei Pregadi (the Senate) and he held also the office as one of the Savi di Terraferma (an office comparable to a minister).

In 1547 he was appointed ambassador to England. Returned in Venice, in 1551 he served in the Council of Ten. In 1556 he was appointed lieutenant (governor) of Friuli where he successfully managed a crisis due to famine and plague: an arch in Udine (the Arco Bollani built in 1556 and attributed to Andrea Palladio) remembers his activity.

In 1558 he was appointed as podestà (governor) of Brescia, where he was able to settle a dispute with the near Duchy of Milan for the use of the waters of Oglio river.

Ecclesiastic career 
Even if he was not an ecclesiastic, he was proposed as new bishop of Brescia by the citizen of the town, and this candidature was approved by both the Republic of Venice and by Pope Paul IV who formally appointed him on 14 March 1559. He was ordained priest in Brescia in the spring of 1559, celebrated his first mass in the cathedral of Brescia on 15 August 1559, and he was consecrated bishop in the autumn of the same year in Venice.

Domenico Bollani participated in the final stages of the Council of Trent, and he was ready to implement the consequent reform in his diocese. Following the requests of the council, he founded the seminary in 1568, he gathered a diocesan synod in 1574 and was anxious to personally visit the parishes of the diocese of Brescia. When in 1577 the plague spread in the city, in a moment's hesitation he left the town, than he chose to return to take care of the sicks, following the example of Charles Borromeo. In 1567 he completed the construction of the new Bishop's Palace in Brescia, started almost a century before.

He died in Brescia on 12 August 1579 in the arms of Charles Borromeo.

References 

1514 births
1579 deaths
16th-century Roman Catholic bishops in the Republic of Venice
Bishops of Brescia
Republic of Venice diplomats
Republic of Venice politicians
Participants in the Council of Trent